Loko Masama Chiefdom is a chiefdom in the Port Loko District of Sierra Leone. Its capital is Petifu.

References 

Chiefdoms of Sierra Leone
Northern Province, Sierra Leone